Ronit Elkabetz (27 November 1964 – 19 April 2016) was an Israeli actress, screenwriter and film director. She worked in both Israeli and French cinema. She won three Ophir Awards and received a total of seven nominations.

Biography
Elkabetz was born in Beersheba in 1964 to a religious Moroccan Jewish family, originally from Essaouira. She grew up in Kiryat Yam. Her mother spoke French and Moroccan Arabic, but her father insisted on speaking only Hebrew. Elkabetz was the oldest of four children, with three younger brothers. Her younger brother Shlomi also became a director, and they worked together on the trilogy Gett: The Trial of Viviane Amsalem.

Elkabetz never studied acting and started her career as a model. She divided her time between her homes in Paris and Tel Aviv. She married architect Avner Yashar, the son of prominent architect Yitzhak Yashar and singer Rema Samsonov, on 25 June 2010. In 2012, they had a twin son and daughter. During her final years, she was honorary president of the Mizrahi feminist movement "Ahoti – for Women in Israel", and volunteered in the organization's activities, such as the fair trade store and clothing drives. In 2015 she was selected to be the President of the Jury for the International Critics' Week section of the 2015 Cannes Film Festival.

Acting and directing career

Elkabetz's first film appearance was in The Appointed (1990), where she played in the starring role opposite Shuli Rand.
They both starred in  Eddie King in 1992. In 1994 she starred in Sh'Chur, for which she won the Israeli Film Academy (Ophir) Award. In 1995 she wrote with her partner, Haim Buzaglo, the script for Scar, in which she also starred, and for which she learned French. In 1996 she starred in Amos Gitai's Metamorphosis of a Melody. In 1997 she moved to Paris to study in Ariane Mnouchkine's Théâtre du Soleil. During that period, she supported herself as a waitress. She did a one-woman show on the life of the choreographer Martha Graham at the Avignon Festival.

In 2001 she starred in the French film Origine contrôlée, and won her second Ophir Award for Late Marriage. In 2003 she teamed again with Gitai on Alila. In 2004 she was nominated for an Ophir Award for Or (My Treasure), and starred in the Israeli legal drama series Franco and Spector.

In 2004 she wrote, directed (with her brother, Shlomi Elkabetz) and starred in the semi-autobiographic film To Take a Wife, for which she was again nominated for an Ophir Award. 

In 2006 she also starred in the Israeli drama series Parashat HaShavua. In 2007 she starred in Eran Kolirin's The Band's Visit, for which she won her third Ophir Award.

In 2008 she and Shlomi finished their second film, Shiva ("Seven Days"), which won the Wolgin Award for Best Feature Film at the 2008 Jerusalem Film Festival.

In 2009 she starred alongside Catherine Deneuve in André Téchiné's La Fille du Rer. Her other recent French projects have included Ashes and Blood, Turk's Head, and Les mains libres. In 2010 she received an Ophir Award nomination for Best Actress for her work in Mabul. She was recently the subject of Nir Bergman's documentary A Stranger in Paris.

Her 2014 film Gett: The Trial of Viviane Amsalem was selected to be screened as part of the Directors' Fortnight section of the 2014 Cannes Film Festival. This was the final film Elkabetz directed prior to her death.

Critical acclaim
Israeli film critic Uri Klein wrote: "Moviegoers can admire Ronit Elkabetz or recoil from her, or admire and recoil at the same time. Ignoring her is not an option. The mystery and the exoticism, the threat and the danger have ultimately gathered into a potent presence and cogent control."

In May 2010, Elkabetz received the France Culture award at the Cannes Film Festival, a prize awarded to filmmakers for quality work and social involvement. The judges described her as a "woman teeming with passion and erotica, who can even play the queen of Egypt."

Pascal Elbé director of Turk's Head cited his enthusiasm for casting Elkabetz. "I chose an actress who reminds me of those great Italian stars of the postwar period, like Anna Magnani."

In 2010, Elkabetz received a lifetime achievement award from the Israeli Film Academy for her contribution to Israeli cinema.

Death
Elkabetz died of lung cancer in Tel Aviv on 19 April 2016 at the age of 51 after a long struggle with the disease. She is buried at Kiryat Shaul Cemetery.

Film and television credits

References

External links

 
 
 Interview with Ronit Elkabetz, The Jewish Chronicle; accessed 3 June 2017.
 Yigal S. Nizri, In her Image: Towards an Artistic Biography of Ronit Elkabetz in Je T’aime, Ronit Elkabetz edited by Ya’ara Keydar (Design Museum Holon, 2017).
 The exhibition page in Design Museum Holon, 2017–2018.

1964 births
2016 deaths
People from Kiryat Yam
Actors from Beersheba
Writers from Beersheba
Models from Beersheba
Israeli film actresses
Israeli television actresses
Israeli female screenwriters
Israeli women film directors
20th-century Israeli Jews
21st-century Israeli Jews
Jewish Israeli actresses
Israeli Mizrahi Jews
Israeli people of Moroccan-Jewish descent
Israeli expatriates in France
20th-century Israeli actresses
21st-century Israeli actresses
20th-century Israeli screenwriters
21st-century Israeli screenwriters
Recipients of the Legion of Honour
Deaths from lung cancer in Israel
Burials at Kiryat Shaul Cemetery
Mizrahi feminists
20th-century Mizrahi Jews
21st-century Mizrahi Jews